The System Average Interruption Frequency Index (SAIFI) is commonly used as a reliability index by electric power utilities.  SAIFI is the average number of interruptions that a customer would experience, and is calculated as

In other words,

SAIFI is measured in units of interruptions per customer. It is usually measured over the course of a year, and according to IEEE Standard 1366-1998 the median value for North American utilities is approximately 1.10 interruptions per customer.

Sources 
 

Electric power
Reliability indices